Mitsoudjé is a town located on the island of Grande Comore in the Comoros. It is also the birthplace of President Azali Assoumani.

References

Populated places in Grande Comore